Carlo Longoni (24 November 1889 – 1969) was an Italian racing cyclist. He rode in the 1923 Tour de France, and the 1926 Tour de France.

References

External links
 

1889 births
1969 deaths
Italian male cyclists
People from Carate Brianza
Cyclists from the Province of Monza e Brianza